Aluminium gallium indium phosphide (also AlInGaP, InGaAlP, GaInP, etc.) is a semiconductor material that provides a platform for the development of novel multi-junction photovoltaics and optoelectronic devices, as it spans a direct bandgap from deep ultraviolet to infrared.

AlGaInP is used in manufacture of light-emitting diodes of high-brightness red, orange, green, and yellow color, to form the heterostructure emitting light. It is also used to make diode lasers.

Formation
AlGaInP layer is often grown by heteroepitaxy on gallium arsenide or gallium phosphide in order to form a quantum well structure. Heteroepitaxy is a kind of epitaxy performed with materials that are different from each other. In heteroepitaxy, a crystalline film grows on a crystalline substrate or film of a different material.

This technology is often used to grow crystalline films of materials for which single crystals cannot 1D view.

Another example of heteroepitaxy is gallium nitride (GaN) on sapphire.

Properties
AlGaInP is a semiconductor, which means that its valence band is completely full. The eV of the band gap between the valence band and the conduction band is small enough that it is able to emit visible  light (1.7 eV - 3.1 eV). The band gap of AlGaInP is between 1.81 eV and 2 eV. This corresponds to red, orange, or yellow light, and that is why the LEDs made from AlGaInP are those colors.

Zinc blende structure
 
AlGaInP's structure is categorized within a specific unit cell called the zinc blende structure. Zinc blende/sphalerite is based on a face-centered cubic lattice of anions. It has 4 asymmetric units in its unit cell. It is best thought of as a face-centered cubic array of anions and cations occupying one half of the tetrahedral holes. Each ion is 4-coordinate and has local tetrahedral geometry. Zinc blende is its own antitype—you can switch the anion and cation positions in the cell and it has no effect (as in NaCl). In fact, replacement of both the zinc and sulfur with carbon gives the diamond structure.

Applications
AlGaInP can be applied to:

Light emitting diodes of high brightness
Diode lasers
Quantum well structures
Solar cells (potential). The use of aluminium gallium indium phosphide with high aluminium content, in a five junction structure, can lead to solar cells with maximum theoretical efficiencies (solar cell efficiency) above 40%

AlGaInP laser

A diode laser consists of a semiconductor material in which a p-n junction forms the active medium and optical feedback is typically provided by reflections at the device facets. AlGaInP diode lasers emit visible and near-infrared light with wavelengths of 0.63-0.76 μm. The primary applications of AlGaInP diode lasers are in optical disc readers, laser pointers, and gas sensors, as well as for optical pumping, and machining.

LED
AlGaInP can be used as an LED. An LED is composed of a p-n junction which contain a p-type and an n-type. 
The material used in the semiconducting element of an LED determines its color.

AlGaInP is one of type of LEDs used for lighting systems. Another is indium gallium nitride (InGaN). Slight changes in the composition of these alloys changes the color of the emitted light. AlGaInP alloys are used to make red, orange and yellow LEDs. InGaN alloys are used to make green, blue and white LEDs.

Safety and toxicity aspects
The toxicology of AlGaInP has not been fully investigated. The dust is an irritant to skin, eyes and lungs. The environment, health and safety aspects of aluminium indium gallium phosphide sources (such as trimethylgallium, trimethylindium and phosphine) and industrial hygiene monitoring studies of standard MOVPE sources have been reported in a review. Illumination by an AlGaInP laser was associated in one study with slower healing of skin wounds in laboratory rats.

See also
 Indium phosphide
 Indium gallium phosphide
 Aluminium gallium phosphide
 Indium gallium arsenide phosphide

References

Notes

High Brightness Light Emitting Diodes:G. B. Stringfellow and M. George Craford, Semiconductors and Semimetals, vol. 48, pp. 97–226.

III-V semiconductors
Aluminium compounds
Gallium compounds
Indium compounds
Phosphides
III-V compounds
Light-emitting diode materials
Zincblende crystal structure